Ptochoryctis galbanea is a moth in the family Autostichidae. It was described by Edward Meyrick in 1914. It is found Sri Lanka.

The wingspan is 30–32 mm. The forewings are rather dark fuscous, with a faint purplish or orchreous gloss and with the extreme costal edge ochreous whitish. The hindwings are dark fuscous.

References

Moths described in 1914
Ptochoryctis